Satsebeli is a Georgian sauce made of tomato paste, cilantro, garlic, vinegar, pepper, khmeli suneli (a traditional Georgian spicy herbs mixture), water and adjika chili paste. It is very hot.

See also
 List of sauces

References

External links 
 Satsebeli. Delishably.com.

Cuisine of Georgia (country)
Sauces